Secretariat Building is a Le Corbusier-designed government building built in 1953, located inside the Chandigarh Capitol Complex which comprises three buildings and three monuments: the Secretariat building, Legislative Assembly building and High Court building, Open Hand Monument, Geometric Hill and Tower of Shadows.

In July 2016, the building and several other works by Le Corbusier were inscribed as UNESCO World Heritage Sites.

Gallery

See also

 List of World Heritage Sites in India

References

External links

 Foundation Le Corbusier
 Corbu in Ahmadabad

Le Corbusier buildings in India
Government buildings completed in 1953
Tourist attractions in Chandigarh
Buildings and structures in Chandigarh
Administrative headquarters of state governments in India